Fugue for a Darkening Island (published in the US as Darkening Island) is a dystopian novel by Christopher Priest. First published in 1972, it deals with a man's struggle to protect his family and himself in a near future England ravaged by civil war. It is brought about by the rise of a new, third party who enter government and combat a massive influx of African refugees, which have been allied in part by the principal opposition faction known as the secessionists, culminating into a multiple party conflict.

Premise
The novel's story is told in an achronological fashion, jumping back and forth between several time periods. The protagonist, a former professor of English named Alan Whitman, is initially concerned only with protecting his wife and daughter but is gradually drawn further into the broader conflict over the course of events. The narrative consists of three broad time periods: the early days of the conflict, in which Whitman goes about his life while being casually aware of the burgeoning crisis, a later period in which he and his family have been displaced from London and are travelling the countryside in search of safety and a final period in which he is travelling through the heavily war-torn countryside with a group of male refugees, a setting which initially makes no mention of the fate of his wife and daughter. The narrative jumps back and forth between the different time periods rapidly, creating a stark contrast between the different stages of conflict and the nature of Whitman's character at these different points, as well as generating tension by not illustrating how the increasingly degraded state of affairs has come to pass.

Main characters 
Alan Whitman: A former college lecturer who soon becomes a refugee along with his wife and daughter. The story starts with the family abandoning their house and travelling away from the various warring factions of the country. He overall shows more favourability to the Secessionists faction in the early parts of the novel while the conflict was just starting. However, he is later torn between the factions as each commit atrocities which greatly affect him towards the end of the novel and later progression of the conflict. this is concluded by the revelation of his families whereabouts and eventual discovery of their fate. He never officially endorses a particular side and becomes distrustful of each faction towards the end of the conflict.

Isobel: Whitman's wife who shares a strained relationship with her husband, which is explained by several past events in the book and culminates in their separation. She is later missing alongside Sally, Alan later discovers her fate with Sally's.

Sally: Whitman's young daughter, Alan cares greatly for Sally and assumes care of her when Isobel departs from the group they are traversing in. She is later missing, with Alan later discovering her fate alongside Isobel's.

Lateef: The leader of the group of refugees Alan and his family join, his and the group's origins are unknown.

Tregarth: He is referred to by Alan several times, explaining his early political history and actions concerning the afrim landings and their subsequent treatment. He is revealed to have originally been an independent MP with strong ultranationalist and protectionist ideological leanings. He later assumes power as prime minister by electing his third party at the general election and gaining a majority within parliament. He becomes an authoritarian leader quickly after the election and exerts executive power with little regard to civil liberties.

Factions 
Nationalists: The ruling power, led by Tregarth who takes a hardline approach to the arrival of the afrims. The faction consolidated its power after the election of Tregarth, who uses executive powers with little regards to civil liberties.

Secessionists: The main opposition to the nationalist forces. They are known to promote integration with afrims and take a much more liberal approach to the social issues of the conflict. The faction was primarily created by the defection from the army, navy, air force and police forces.

Afrims: The immigrants from Africa, who have been fleeing the state of turmoil on the continent due to the use of nuclear weapons and covert foreign intervention by major powers. It is this exodus of people which catalyses the civil war. Some afrims choose to side with Secessionists, whereas others remain within the homogenous group.

Welfare groups/red cross: Throughout the novel, different welfare organisations including the red cross are mentioned. The group at times helps various refugees, playing a purely humanitarian role in the conflict and helps displaced groups in need.

United States: The only reference to the United States in relation to the conflict is the detachment of marines sent as an advisory force to the nationalist side. Implying the United States is backing the nationalists in the war.

United Nations: The U.N has peacekeeping forces present on the island, which occasionally intervene in the conflict but overall have little to no effect on the progression of the war.

Other nations: Other world powers including Russia and China are mentioned and it is implied they are selling arms to certain factions in the conflict as proxies.

Reception
Fugue for a Darkening Island was well received both upon release and in later years, coming third in the 1973 John W. Campbell Memorial Award, while a 2011 review in Starburst magazine stated that it is 'positively prescient in its foretelling'.

2011 Revised Edition

The novel was re-published by Gollancz in 2011 in revised form, with the text updated and changed by the author.

References

1972 British novels
Novels by Christopher Priest
1972 science fiction novels
English novels
Faber and Faber books
Dystopian novels